Republic of Doyle is a Canadian comedy-drama television series set in St. John's, Newfoundland and Labrador, which originally aired on CBC Television. It premiered on January 6, 2010 and ended on December 10, 2014, with a total of 77 episodes over the course of 6 seasons.

Series overview

Episodes

Season 1 (2010)

Season 2 (2011)

Season 3 (2012)

Season 4 (2013)

Season 5 (2013–14)

Season 6 (2014)
On April 4, 2014, CBC renewed Republic of Doyle for a sixth and final season.

See also
Sweating Bullets, referenced in Season 1, Episode 2 with guest star Rob Stewart
"The Gift of the Magi", mentioned in Season 1, Episode 11

References

External links
 
 

Lists of Canadian television series episodes
Lists of comedy-drama television series episodes